Webber Lake is a lake of Halifax Regional Municipality, Nova Scotia, Canada. It is situated between Middle Sackville and Lucasville, just south of Nova Scotia Highway 101.

See also
List of lakes in Nova Scotia

References

Lakes of Nova Scotia